Joseph-Alexis Stoltz (14 December 1803, in Andlau – 20 May 1896) was a French obstetrician.

In 1829 he became an associate professor at the University of Strasbourg, where in 1834 he was appointed professor of accouchements (obstetrics). In 1867 he was appointed dean to the faculty of medicine at Strasbourg. Due to consequences of the Franco-Prussian War, the medical faculty relocated to Nancy in 1872, where Stoltz resumed his role as dean.

Stoltz is credited for introducing into French obstetrics the technique of induced premature labor in cases of dangerous parturition. He also made improvements to the obstetrical forceps.

He was the author of many papers in the fields of obstetrics, gynecology and pediatrics, and penned the introduction to Hermann Franz Naegele's Traité pratique de l'art des accouchements. The following are a few of his principal writings:
 Considérations sur quelques points relatifs à l'art des accouchements, 1826
 De la délivrance, 1834
 Mémoire et observations sur la provocation de l'accouchement prématuré dans des cas de rétrécissements du bassin, 1835.

References 

French obstetricians
1803 births
1896 deaths
Academic staff of the University of Strasbourg
People from Bas-Rhin
Academic staff of Nancy-Université
19th-century French physicians